Poema rondelurilor is the title of a 1927 collection of rondel cycles by the Romanian poet Alexandru Macedonski. It contains the following rondels divided into the following cycles:

Rondelurile pribege
Rondelul lucrurilor 
Rondelul oraşului mic 
Rondelul de aur 
Rondelul lunii 
Rondelul crinilor 
Rondelul ţiganilor 
Rondelul cercetaşilor 
Rondelul plecării 
Rondelul oraşului din Indii 
Rondelul morii 
Rondelul contemporanilor 
Rondelul meu
Rondelurile celor patru vânturi
Rondelul cupei de Murano 
Rondelul privighetoarei 
Rondelul trecutului 
Rondelul oglindei 
Rondelul domniţei 
Rondelul oraşului de altădată 
Rondelul orelor 
Rondelul ajungerii la cer 
Rondelul ctitorilor 
Rondelul coroanelor nepieritoare
Rondelurile rozelor
Rondelul rozelor ce mor 
Rondelul lui Saadi 
Rondelul rozelor din Cişmegi 
Rondelul marilor roze 
Rondelul beat de roze 
Rondelul cascadelor de roze 
Rondelul privighetoarei între roze 
Rondelul rozelor de august 
Rondelul rozei ce înfloreşte 
Rondelul lui Saadi ieşind dintre roze
Rondelurile rozelor de azi şi de ieri
Rondelul rozelor de azi şi de ieri 
Rondelul nopţii argintate
Rondelurile Senei
Rondelul înecaţilor 
Rondelul florilor de lună 
Rondelul Parisului iad 
Rondelul dezastrului mondial 
Rondelul uriaşului 
Rondelul ticăloşilor 
Rondelul înălţimilor 
Rondelul Franţei burgheze 
Rondelul duminicilor de la Bellevue 
Rondelul sfârşitului
Rondelurile de porţelan
Rondelul lui Tsing-Ly-Tsi 
Rondelul podului de onix 
Rondelul pagodei 
Rondelul apei din ograda japonezului 
Rondelul muzmeiei 
Rondelul opiumului 
Rondelul Mării Japoneze 
Rondelul crizantemei 
Rondelul Ioshiwarei 
Rondelul chinezilor din Paris 
Epigraf final

Alexandru Macedonski
Romanian poetry